MNL Cup Grand Royal 2009 is the inaugural knock-out club football tournament of the Myanmar National League. The tournament, held at the Aung San Stadium and the Thuwunna Stadium in Yangon between 16 May and 5 July 2009, was contested by all eight clubs of the newly formed professional league. Yadanabon FC finished on top, one point ahead of Yangon United FC in group stage. On 5 July 2009, Yadanabon defeated Yangon United in the cup final on penalty shootout, to become the reigning champions of the league.

Teams
 Delta United
 Kanbawza
 Magway
 Okktha United
 Southern Myanmar United
 Yadanabon
 Yangon United
 Zeyashwemye

Results

League standings

Round system

Final
The 2009 Myanmar National League Cup final was played at 4:00 on 5 July 2009 at the Thuwunna Stadium in Yangon, Myanmar. Yadanabon defeated Yangon United on penalty kicks (4-1), after a 2–2 score at the end of regulation and extra time.

Top goalscorers

 6 goals
 Yan Paing (Yadanabon)
 4 goals
 Sithu Win (Magway)
 Kyi Lin (Yangon United)
 3 goals
 Tun Tun Win (Yadanabon)
 Ye Wai Yan Soe (Zeyashwemye)
 2 goals
 Aung Myint Aye (Magway)
 Khin Maung Lwin (Kanbawza)
 Aung Kyaw Oo (Kanbawza)
 Wai Linn (Southern Myanmar United)
 Kera (Yangon United)
 Missipo (Yangon United)
 Aung Kyaw Moe (Yadanabon)
 Htoo Kyaw (Zeyashwemye)
 Sithu Than (Zeyashwemye)
 B James Htwe (Southern Myanmar United)

References

External links
 Official website
 Season on RSSSF

Myanmar National League seasons
1
Myanmar
Myanmar